Myron Smith Allen (March 22, 1854 – March 8, 1924) nicknamed "Zeke", was a Major League Baseball outfielder who played for four seasons. He played for the New York Gothams in 1883, the Boston Beaneaters in 1886, the Cleveland Blues in 1887, and the Kansas City Cowboys in 1888.

External links

1854 births
1924 deaths
Major League Baseball outfielders
Baseball players from New York (state)
Sportspeople from Kingston, New York
New York Gothams players
Boston Beaneaters players
Cleveland Blues (1887–88) players
Kansas City Cowboys players
Minor league baseball managers
Richmond Virginias players
Albany Governors players
Olean (minor league baseball) players
Kingston Patriarchs players
Kingston Colonels players
Binghamton Crickets (1880s) players
19th-century baseball players
Cobleskill Giants players